Rangeley Lake State Park is a public recreation area occupying  on the southern shore of Rangeley Lake in Franklin County, Maine. The state park is located partly in the town of Rangeley and partly in Rangeley Plantation. It is managed by the Maine Department of Agriculture, Conservation and Forestry.

The park is 1 of 5 Maine State Parks that are in the path of totality for the 2024 solar eclipse, with 2 minutes and 19 seconds of totality.

History
The park was created in 1960 when the Bureau of Parks and Lands made three acquisitions totaling . Oxford County and international paper companies donated half of the park property. A  parcel was added to the park in 2009 with the assistance of the Rangeley Lakes Heritage Trust. The acquisition, which cost $595,000.00, was made using funds from the Land for Maine's Future program.

Activities and amenities
The park offers picnicking, a 50-site campground, swimming beach, hiking trails, and docks and launch ramp for motorized boating. The lake's  house landlocked salmon and brook trout.

References

External links
Rangeley Lake State Park Department of Agriculture, Conservation and Forestry
Rangeley Lake State Park Guide & Map Department of Agriculture, Conservation and Forestry

Protected areas of Franklin County, Maine
State parks of Maine
State parks of the Appalachians
Campgrounds in Maine
Protected areas established in 1960
1960 establishments in Maine